List of Bombardier recreational and snow vehicles and products.

These vehicles and craft were made by Bombardier or from 2003 Bombardier Recreational Products of Canada. In 2004 the industrial vehicles division was sold to the Camoplast company of Canada. Subsequently, Camoplast sold their Track Machines Division to Prinoth, which is part of the Leitner Group .

Outboard motors
(now marketed under the Evinrude brand) 
Evinrude Outboard Motors purchased 2001
Johnson Outboards purchased 2001
Outboard Marine Corporation purchased 2001

Road and off-road vehicles    
Can-Am ATV's
DS50
DS70
DS90
DS90X
DS250
DS650
DS650 Baja
Renegade 570/850/1000
Rally 200
Outlander 450/570
Defender
Maverick
Commander
Can-Am motorcycles
Can-Am Spyder three-wheel roadster
John Deere Buck all-terrain vehicle made by Bombardier

Snowmobiles and Snowcats
Bombardier Bombi
Moto-Ski purchased 1971
Ski Doo (redirect to BRV)
Lynx (snowmobile) of Finland, purchased (?)
John Deere Buck all-terrain vehicle made by Bombardier
Muskeg tractor for snow conditions, of 1950s

Watercraft
Sea-Doo, Bombardier brand of personal water craft
Sea-Doo XP, specific model of personal water craft
Sea-Doo GTX, specific model of personal water craft
Bombardier Invitation sailboat
Bombardier 7.6 sailboat

Engines
Rotax (Austria), engines for many of above

Bombardier Recreational Products
Bombardier Inc. products
Bombardier